PiHKAL: A Chemical Love Story is a book by Dr. Alexander Shulgin and Ann Shulgin, published in 1991. The subject of the work is psychoactive phenethylamine chemical derivatives, notably those that act as psychedelics and/or empathogen-entactogens. The main title, PiHKAL, is an acronym that stands for "Phenethylamines I Have Known and Loved."

The book is arranged into two parts, the first part being a fictionalized autobiography of the couple and the second part describing 179
different psychedelic compounds (most of which Shulgin discovered himself), including detailed synthesis instructions, bioassays, dosages, and other commentary.

The second part was made freely available by Shulgin on Erowid while the first part is available only in the printed text. While the reactions described are beyond the ability of people with a basic chemistry education, some tend to emphasize techniques that do not require difficult-to-obtain chemicals. Notable among these are the use of mercury-aluminum amalgam (an unusual but easy to obtain reagent) as a reducing agent and detailed suggestions on legal plant sources of important drug precursors such as safrole.

Impact and popularity 

Through PIHKAL (and later TIHKAL), Shulgin sought to ensure that his discoveries would escape the limits of professional research labs and find their way to the public, a goal consistent with his stated beliefs that psychedelic drugs can be valuable tools for self-exploration. The MDMA ("ecstasy") synthesis published in PIHKAL remains one of the most common clandestine methods of its manufacture to this day. Many countries have banned the major substances for which this book gives directions for synthesis, such as 2C-B, 2C-T-2, and 2C-T-7. In the United Kingdom, all but phenethylamine are illegal.

In 1994, two years after PIHKAL was published, the Drug Enforcement Administration (DEA) raided Shulgin's lab and requested that he turn over his DEA license. Richard Meyer, spokesman for DEA's San Francisco Field Division, has stated in reference to PIHKAL "It is our opinion that those books are pretty much cookbooks on how to make illegal drugs. Agents tell me that in clandestine labs that they have raided, they have found copies of those books," suggesting that the publication of PIHKAL and the termination of Shulgin's license may have been related.

Notable compounds

Essential amphetamines  

The "Essential Amphetamines" are what Shulgin describes as ten amphetamines that differ from natural products such as safrole or myristicin by an amine group (PIHKAL Entry #157 TMA). The list consists of:
 PMA (para-methoxy-amphetamine)
 2,4-DMA (2,4-dimethoxy-amphetamine)
 3,4-DMA (3,4-dimethoxy-amphetamine)
 MDA (3,4-methylenedioxy-amphetamine)
 MMDA (3-methoxy-4,5-methylendioxy-amphetamine)
 MMDA-3a (2-methoxy-3,4-methylendioxyamphetamine)
 MMDA-2 (2-methoxy-4,5-methylendioxyamphetamine)
 TMA (3,4,5-trimethoxyamphetamine)
 TMA-2 (2,4,5-trimethoxyamphetamine)
 DMMDA (2,5-dimethoxy-3,4-methylenedioxyamphetamine)
 DMMDA-2 (2,3-dimethoxy-4,5-methylenedioxyamphetamine)
 TeMA (2,3,4,5-tetramethoxyamphetamine)

Not all of these chemicals are bioassayed in PIHKAL; some are merely mentioned.

Magical half-dozen 

The so-called "magical half-dozen" refers to Shulgin's self-rated most important phenethylamine compounds, all of which except mescaline he developed and synthesized himself. They are found within the first book of PIHKAL, and are as follows:
 Mescaline (3,4,5-trimethoxyphenethylamine)
 DOM (2,5-dimethoxy-4-methylamphetamine), DOM being short for desoxy methyl, referring to the removal of the Oxygen atom from the Methoxy group on the "4" carbon.
 2C-B (2,5-dimethoxy-4-bromophenethylamine)
 2C-E (2,5-dimethoxy-4-ethylphenethylamine)
 2C-T-2 (2,5-dimethoxy-4-ethylthiophenethylamine)
 2C-T-7 (2,5-dimethoxy-4-propylthiophenethylamine)

All six are now Schedule I controlled substances in the United States.

Phenethylamines listed

See also 
 TiHKAL, the 1997 book by the same authors on tryptamines.
 Substituted Phenethylamine (PEA)
 Substituted Amphetamine (AMPH)
 Substituted Methylenedioxyphenethylamine (MDxx)
 Olivetol

References

External links 

 Erowid Online Books: PIHKAL: A Chemical Love Story by Alexander & Ann Shulgin
 PIHKAL • Info: A Visual Index and Map of PIHKAL: A Chemical Love Story by Alexander & Ann Shulgin
 "Shulgin in Spanish" Project – Information on the first complete translation of PIHKAL and TIHKAL into Spanish
 Transform Press – Publisher of PiHKAL

Psychedelic drug research
Psychedelic phenethylamines
1991 non-fiction books
Science books
Psychedelic literature